Anime's Compilation Best is the first compilation (fifth overall) album of J-pop singer Kotoko under Geneon Entertainment. It was released on December 23, 2009.

This album contains the title tracks from her second to thirteenth single (except for her fourth single 421: A Will) that features her anime tie-up songs.

The album comes in a limited CD+DVD edition (GNCV-1019) and a regular CD-only edition (GNCV-1020). The DVD contains selected five of Kotoko's songs performed on  concert.

CD Track listing 
Re-sublimity — 5:19
Lyrics: Kotoko
Composition/Arrangement: Kazuya Takase
 — 5:44
Lyrics/Composition: Kotoko
Arrangement: Sorma No.1
Face of Fact (Resolution Ver.) — 5:01
Lyrics: Kotoko
Composition/Arrangement: C.G mix
Being — 4:49
Lyrics/Composition: Kotoko
Arrangement: Kazuya Takase
 — 4:39
Lyrics: Oyuki Konno
Composition/Arrangement: C.G mix
 — 4:00
Lyrics: Oyuki Konno
Composition: Marty Friedman
Arrangement: Tomoyuki Nakazawa, Maiko Iuchi
 — 4:26
Lyrics: Kotoko
Composition/Arrangement: Kazuya Takase
 — 4:38
Lyrics: Kotoko
Composition/Arrangement: C.G mix
Blaze — 5:06
Lyrics: Kotoko
Composition/Arrangement: Kazuya Takase
Special Life! — 4:23
Lyrics: Kotoko
Composition/Arrangement: C.G mix
Daily-daily Dream — 5:07
Lyrics: Kotoko
Composition/Arrangement: C.G mix

DVD Track listing 

Re-sublimity

Blaze
Bumpy-Jumpy!

Sales Trajectory

References

2009 albums
Kotoko (singer) albums